Ahmedabad Rockets was one of the nine teams played in the defunct Indian Cricket League. It was captained by former Australian international batsman Damien Martyn. The team represents Ahmedabad, the largest city in the state of Gujarat. The team debuted on 9 March 2008 in a Twenty20 match against Chandigarh Lions. The Indian Cricket League and its membership teams are now defunct due to lack of public interest, monetary insufficiencies, and corporate mismanagement.

Previous performance

References

Indian Cricket League teams
Cricket clubs established in 2008
Cricket in Gujarat
Former senior cricket clubs of India
Sports clubs disestablished in 2008
Cricket in Ahmedabad
2008 establishments in Gujarat